Finch is an American post-hardcore band from Temecula, California. The band released an EP Falling into Place and two full-length albums, What It Is to Burn and Say Hello to Sunshine before declaring a hiatus in 2006. Finch reformed in 2007, playing a reunion show on November 23 at the Glasshouse in Pomona, California. They released a self-titled EP a year later, and were in the process of writing their third studio album when they disbanded in late 2010. After playing a group of shows commemorating the ten-year anniversary of What It Is to Burn in 2012, Finch signed with Razor & Tie in 2014 and revealed that they were working on a new studio album. The album was titled Back to Oblivion and released on September 30, 2014. In October 2016, Finch announced its third official break up. The band were announced as reforming for the 2023 edition of When We Were Young festival.

History

Early history (1999–2001)
Finch originally formed under the name Numb with Nate Barcalow on vocals, Alex Linares on guitar, Derek Doherty on bass and Alex Pappas on drums. It was thought that Numb was a Deftones cover band, though Finch has since denied this claim, referring to the rumor as a "misquote that's haunted us for years." Guitarist Randy Strohmeyer was invited to join Finch after they witnessed him play with his band Evita Fresh. Strohmeyer became friends with Drive-Thru Records owner Richard Reines following a fan letter he had sent in a few years prior. When he mentioned this to the other members of Finch, they were enthusiastic about potentially signing with the label. Reines offered the group a chance to perform and subsequently invited his sister, and co-label owner, Stefanie to the performance. The pair were impressed and signed the group. The group then officially changed their name to Finch and released their first EP Falling into Place in 2001. The EP sold over 6,000 copies within a few months of its release.

What It Is to Burn (2002–2004)
Pre-production and demos were done for their debut album, What It Is to Burn, at DML Studios in Escondido, California in February and April 2001. They began recording What It Is to Burn in June at Big Fish Studios in Encinitas, California with producer Mark Trombino. After tracking guitars in July, recording subsequently continued into August and September. Daryl Palumbo of Glassjaw performs guest vocals on "Grey Matter" and "Project Mayhem"; the group had met Palumbo at a Deftones show and had kept in contact with him, later asking him if he wanted to participate. 

The resulting product was predominantly described as emo and pop punk, although it occasionally was labeled hardcore punk or post-hardcore. The writing process for What It Is to Burn revolved around the group jamming. Linares said they could write some songs in two hours, and other times take a whole day. Collectively, Strohmeyer said it took a year to write all of the material on the album.

Preceded by a music video for "Letters to You" in January 2002, What It Is to Burn was released on March 12 as a joint release between MCA and Drive-Thru Records, followed by a release in the UK on June 2. 

In an effort to promote the record, the group toured extensively. They began shortly after the album's release by touring with Moth. In April and May, the group went on tour with Brand New and The Starting Line. Following this, the group went on a UK tour with New Found Glory. Between late June and mid-August, the group performed on Warped Tour as part of the Drive-Thru Records Stage. In late August, the group performed at the Reading and Leeds Festivals in the UK. In September, the group performed a few shows in Japan. In October and November, the band went tour across the US alongside New Found Glory, Something Corporate and Further Seems Forever.

In November and December, the group went on a UK tour with From Autumn to Ashes and Coheed and Cambria. The band continued touring with From Autumn to Ashes across the US in January and February. Allister were initially planned to support, but they were later replaced by Steel Train. In February, the band went on a co-heading US tour with The Used.   Following this, the group continued touring with The Movielife, Senses Fail and A Static Lullaby until early March.

In March, the group went on a tour of the UK with Brand New. In April, the group performed at Skate and Surf Fest. In early May, the band performed as a special guest at two shows of MTV's Campus Invasion tour. In June, the band appeared on Jimmy Kimmel Live! and performed at KROQ's Weenie Roast festival. In early July, the group appeared on Last Call with Carson Daly. In August, the group performed at Furnace Fest, before playing on the main stage at the Reading and Leeds Festivals.

Say Hello to Sunshine (2005)
During the time of this recording, the band largely fell from the public eye, and the band faced some changes for the recording of their second album, Say Hello to Sunshine. The group also went through major changes first by going through three different record labels, Drive-Thru Records and MCA Records, which was then purchased by Geffen Records before its release. Founding band member drummer Alex Pappas left the band due to musical differences; he was replaced by Marc Allen. Pappas would later form Redgun Radar. The band took their time recording the album and often scrapped songs in order to record new ones. Finch finally released Say Hello to Sunshine on June 7, 2005. The first single of the album was "Bitemarks and Bloodstains" and was also the first song the band wrote for the album. In an interview Nate Barcalow stated that "Bitemarks makes the transition between the old and the new sound."

After Say Hello to Sunshines release, many fans were left disappointed in the sharp musical change in the new album. However, the departure from the What It Is to Burn sound was also praised by some, as the band introduced a more authentic post-hardcore style to their music.

Hiatus (2006–2007)
On February 19, 2006, it was revealed that the group was "officially on an 'indefinite hiatus'. Members of the band are currently jamming with other projects." The hiatus was confirmed shortly after with a post by the band on their official website. The posting reads as follows:
 
Through much thought and deliberation, the five of us have decided to take an indefinite break from Finch. Amongst the many reasons for our decision, our individual priorities just lie in different places.  We can't express how grateful we are to all of you for the past five years.  We’ve had the opportunity to play the music we love for a living.  The five of us will always feel lucky for that.  Again, thank you all so much for the love and support you’ve given us.  A special thanks as well, to all who have worked closely with us over the years to make things happen.  A list of names would just be too long.  You know who you are.

During the break, the members of Finch still remained active. Marc Allen joined a band with his brother, Adam, called Helen Earth Band. Randy Strohmeyer started a side project called Gazillionaire, and also managed various indie rock bands. Former drummer, Alex Pappas, played drums in Redgun Radar until they disbanded in 2007, then played drums for The Guana Batz. Nate Barcalow started a side project called Cosmonaut. Alex Linares continued his education. Bass player Derek Doherty got involved in the real estate industry, and then eventually went on to be convicted of fraud. Doherty was sentenced to 15 months in prison and ordered to pay $98,835 restitution involving a scheme to defraud clients by taking advance fees for loan audits that he never performed.

Reunion, Finch EP, attempted third album and second break up (2007–2011)
Finch reformed in late 2007, performed at a few American West Coast shows and began booking more dates for 2008. During Finch's early 2008 reunion shows, the band began debuting new songs live. These new songs would later become part of the four-song EP titled Finch. The digital version of the EP was released on July 22, 2008, and a CD version exclusive to Hot Topic was released shortly thereafter due to a manufacturing delay. The EP is notable for being the band's first album that was released independently of a record label. Finch spent most of 2008 touring in support of the release, including a July/August headlining tour with Scary Kids Scaring Kids, Foxy Shazam and Tickle Me Pink.

Finch announced in October 2008 that they had begun work on their third full-length album. In May 2009, Finch released a demo for the song "Hail to the Fire" on their Myspace page, which was presumably to be a part of their new album. Coinciding with the song release, the band posted a blog entry updating their fans with the progress on the new album. In the update, Finch stated that they had "a bunch" of demos written, new songs would be performed in upcoming tour dates, the new album would be recorded during mid 2009, and that they would possibly search for a label in the near future to release it. Shortly after the release of "Hail to the Fire," Finch redesigned their website and gave away free digital copies of their self-titled EP.

On December 17, 2010, after an extended period of inactivity and infrequent updates, Finch officially announced that they had broken up. Their third studio album failed to materialize as each member had broadened his "musical ," which made it difficult for the band to collaborate on new music. On the day of their announced break, Finch also released several new items through their webstore. A digital single titled Epilogue was released that featured two mastered recordings of "Hail to the Fire" and "World of Violence", which were to appear on their third album. Also released was a free download of "Bury White" originally by Far, a new version of Finch with three bonus tracks, and the American release of A Far Cry From Home (previously only available in Japan).

In 2012, Nate Barcalow formed a new band called Earthbound Ghost.

Second reformation and Back to Oblivion (2012–2014)
In late 2012, Finch's old manager asked the band members if they would be interested in doing one show in celebration of the 10th anniversary of the release of their debut album, What It Is to Burn. Guitarist Alex Linares recalled his initial reaction to the proposal: "I was like, 'I don't know, it's a lot of trouble for one show. But all right, I'll do it for two shows! Let's do a California show, and let's do a London show. I want to go on vacation to England one more time!'" In October 2012, Finch announced it would reunite and perform What It Is to Burn in its entirety for one night on February 1, 2013, in California, followed shortly by announcement of a second California date after the first one sold out along with a UK date. The lineup for the reunion shows included long-time members Nate Barcalow, Randy Strohmeyer and Alex Linares, in addition to Alex Pappas, who left Finch in 2004 before the release of Say Hello to Sunshine, and Daniel Wonacott, who joined the band during its previous reunion. Finch continued to add individual What It Is to Burn anniversary dates until it became several North American tours, beginning with a March tour featuring The Almost and The World Is a Beautiful Place & I Am No Longer Afraid to Die and ending with an October tour with Dance Gavin Dance. Strohmeyer did not perform at some of the reunion tours because his father died in late 2013. Footage from the band's initial reunion show in California was recorded and released as a live CD/DVD titled What It Is to Burn X Live on January 7, 2014, through Tragic Hero Records.

Following the anniversary tours, the future of Finch was uncertain. During its final 2013 tour dates, the band started playing a new song titled "Back to Oblivion" live. Linares commented on the band's 2013 writing sessions, stating: "There's no certainty as to what's going to come of it. Maybe it'll be a full album and two years of worldwide touring, or it'll be 30 demo songs and that's it. I think positively and hope for the best, but I can't promise anything." In a different interview, Strohmeyer also commented on the band's uncertainty and the members' other projects, stating: "We don't really talk about it too much. Then Nate's got another band that he fronts and he is very into that and Alex went to culinary school and works in a lot of kitchens and I think he's actually opening up a food cart. And Daniel Wonacott makes a lot of apps and Pappas is like a full-on recording engineer and he's great." But in March 2014, Finch announced it would join Warped Tour and release a new album through Razor & Tie later in the year. Barcalow said Finch felt out of place on Warped Tour, which primarily featured bands of a younger generation, but offered a counterpoint: "on the other hand, a lot of kids would approach us at signings and say 'I'd never heard your band before today, and I really like you guys.' That makes it all worth it, in a way. If we're still getting new fans, we must be doing something right." Produced by Brian Virtue (Thirty Seconds to Mars, Jane's Addiction, Chevelle), Finch released its third studio album titled Back to Oblivion in the US on September 30 through Razor & Tie. Finch promoted the album with an online stream of "Two Guns to the Temple" prior to the release of the album, and toured North America in September–November 2014 with Maps & Atlases, which was originally going to feature Weatherbox, but was replaced with Helen Earth Band, which features former Finch drummer Marc Allen.

Acoustic album, attempted fourth studio album and third breakup (2015–2016)
On November 13, 2015, Finch released the album Steel, Wood and Whiskey for free on their website. This acoustic album features newly recorded renditions of songs from their entire back catalog.

Following the tours in support of Back to Oblivion, Finch began working on a follow-up and fourth studio album in mid-2015. However, according to a statement by the rest of the band, Barcalow drew distant from Finch due to creative differences, did not show up to most of the recording sessions for their next album and stopped communicating altogether by January 2016. The band received offers to play festivals throughout 2016 and showed an interest in accepting, but was unable to get a hold of Barcalow. In October 2016, Barcalow privately announced on Instagram that Finch had broken up and posted nine demo songs from the scrapped new album's recording sessions to his personal YouTube account. The following day, the other members of Finch posted a statement from their perspective, claiming that "[Barcalow] quit again, for the third time in the bands history" and posted two demos also from scrapped new album's recording sessions to Finch's official YouTube account: "Monuments" and "These Buildings are Burning".

In early 2016, Linares, Pappas, Wonacott formed a new band with Buddy Nielsen of Senses Fail called Speak the Truth... Even If Your Voice Shakes, but mainly referred to as just Speak the Truth.

Following their third split, Barcalow went on to form the electronic duo outfit Private Lives. They announced a PledgeMusic campaign to crowdfund their debut album No Future in May 2017.

Band membersFinal lineup Nate Barcalow – lead vocals, keyboards (1999–2006, 2007–2010, 2012–2016)
 Alex "Grizz" Linares – rhythm guitar (1999–2006, 2007–2010, 2012–2016), lead guitar (2015-2016)
 Alex Pappas – drums, percussion (2000–2004, 2012–2016)
 Daniel Wonacott – bass guitar, backing vocals (2007–2010, 2012–2016)Former members Randy "R2K" Strohmeyer – lead guitar, backing vocals (1999–2006, 2007–2010, 2012–2015)
 Derek Doherty – bass guitar, backing vocals (1999–2006)
 Marc Allen – drums, percussion (2004–2006)
 Andrew Marcogliese – drums, percussion (2007–2010)
 Daryl Binder – drums, percussion (1999–2000)Timeline'''

Discography

 What It Is to Burn (2002)
 Say Hello to Sunshine (2005)
 Back to Oblivion'' (2014)

References

External links

Musical groups established in 1999
Alternative rock groups from California
Emo musical groups from California
American post-hardcore musical groups
Musical groups disestablished in 2006
Musical groups reestablished in 2007
Musical groups disestablished in 2010
Musical groups reestablished in 2012
Musical groups disestablished in 2016
People from Temecula, California
Geffen Records artists
MCA Records artists
Drive-Thru Records artists
Tragic Hero Records artists
1999 establishments in California